Daihōon-ji (大報恩寺) is a Buddhist temple in Kamigyō-ku, Kyoto, Japan. It is affiliated with Shingon-shū Chizan-ha Buddhism.

History
Daihōon-ji was founded by Guhou Shōnin (求法上人), also known as Gikū (義空) in 1221, the early Kamakura period.  The main hall was constructed around 1227 and escaped the destruction in the Ōnin War. The hondō is the oldest wooden building in existence in Kyoto city.

See also 
Thirteen Buddhist Sites of Kyoto
List of National Treasures of Japan (temples)

External links 
Official website

Buddhist temples in Kyoto Prefecture